Alan Woo is a Canadian writer, who won the Christie Harris Illustrated Children's Literature Prize in 2013 for his debut book Maggie's Chopsticks. His second children's book David Jumps In was released by Kids Can Press in March 2020. He has also published poetry and short stories in Ricepaper, Quills and Plenitude.

Born in England to Chinese immigrant parents, Woo moved with his family to Vancouver, British Columbia in childhood. He is openly gay.

References

Canadian children's writers
Canadian male short story writers
Canadian male poets
21st-century Canadian poets
Canadian writers of Asian descent
Writers from Vancouver
Living people
Canadian LGBT poets
Canadian gay writers
Canadian people of Chinese descent
Year of birth missing (living people)
Place of birth missing (living people)
21st-century Canadian short story writers
21st-century Canadian male writers
21st-century Canadian LGBT people
Gay poets